HKSAR Reunification Cup is a cup competition for celebrating the reunification of Hong Kong to China from finishing the colonial rule by United Kingdom. The first edition of the cup was held on 3 July 1997, two days after the Day of Establishment of HKSAR. The second edition was featured by a 4-team competition held on the 5th anniversary in 2002. The third edition was held in 2007 for celebrating the 10th anniversary.

1997

FIFA World Stars
 Team coaches:  Bora Milutinović and  Jozef Vengloš

* Borrowed from AFC All-Star

AFC All-Stars
 Team coach:  Kwok Ka Ming

2002

Squads

Results

2007

China Hong Kong Stars Cup

Lee Shau Kee Cup

Bayern Munich
 Team coach:  Ottmar Hitzfeld

São Paulo

Henderson Reunification Cup

Hong Kong and China Team
 Team coach:  Zhu Guanghu

FIFA World Stars Team
 Team coach:  Gérard Houllier

References

External links
 Hong Kong Football
 HKFA Website, HKSAR 10th Anniversary Reunification Cup

International association football competitions hosted by Hong Kong
1997–98 in Hong Kong football
2001–02 in Hong Kong football
2007–08 in Hong Kong football
2001–02 in Scottish football
2001–02 in South African soccer
2001–02 in Turkish football
2007–08 in German football